
The year 507 BC was a year of the pre-Julian Roman calendar. In the Roman Empire it was known as the Year of the Consulship of Poplicola and Pulvillus (or, less frequently, year 247  Ab urbe condita). The denomination 507 BC for this year has been used since the early medieval period, when the Anno Domini calendar era became the prevalent method in Europe for naming years.

Events 
 By place 

 Greece 
 Cleisthenes takes power in the city-state of Athens and institutes reforms that lead historians to consider him the father of democracy.

Births
 Lu Ban, Chinese inventor and philosopher (d. 440 BC)

Deaths
 Sudharmaswami, Indian religious leader (b. 607 BC)

References